The Royal Anthropological Institute of Great Britain and Ireland (RAI) is a long-established anthropological organisation, and Learned Society, with a global membership. Its remit includes all the component fields of anthropology, such as biological anthropology, evolutionary anthropology, social anthropology, cultural anthropology, visual anthropology and medical anthropology, as well as sub-specialisms within these, and interests shared with neighbouring disciplines such as human genetics, archaeology and linguistics. It seeks to combine a tradition of scholarship with services to anthropologists, including students.

The RAI promotes the public understanding of anthropology, as well as the contribution anthropology can make to public affairs and social issues. It includes within its constituency not only academic anthropologists, but also those with a general interest in the subject, and those trained in anthropology who work in other fields.

History
The institute's fellows are lineal successors to the founding fellows of the Ethnological Society of London, who in February 1843 formed a breakaway group of the Aborigines' Protection Society, which had been founded in 1837. The new society was to be 'a centre and depository for the collection and systematisation of all observations made on human races'.

Between 1863 and 1870 there were two organisations, the Ethnological Society and the Anthropological Society. The Anthropological Institute of Great Britain and Ireland (1871) was the result of a merger between these two rival bodies. Permission to add the word 'Royal' was granted in 1907.

Individuals seeking full Fellowship status are usually required to be proposed by current Fellows who personally know the potential member. Fellowship in the institute is primarily for notable scholars who have professional or academic achievement in the field of the study of humankind or the social sciences. Fellows are elected by the RAI Council, and are entitled to use the honorific post-nominal letters FRAI.

Publications

The Institute publishes three journals:

Journal of the Royal Anthropological Institute, formerly Man, is a quarterly journal with articles on all aspects of anthropology, as well as correspondence and a section of book reviews.  The Journal provides an important forum for 'anthropology as a whole', embracing social anthropology, archaeology, biological anthropology and the study of material culture.  A Special (fifth) issue was inaugurated in 2006.  The Special Issue appears annually, is guest-edited or single-authored, and addresses different themes in anthropology from year to year.

Anthropology Today is a bimonthly publication which aims to provide a forum for the application of anthropological analysis to public and topical issues, while reflecting the breadth of interests within the discipline of anthropology.  It is committed to promoting debate at the interface between anthropology and areas of applied knowledge such as education, medicine and development; as well as that between anthropology and other academic disciplines.

Anthropological Index Online was launched in 1997. The Index is an online bibliographic service for researchers, teachers and students of anthropology worldwide. Access is free to individual users; institutional users (except those in developing countries) pay an annual subscription. Major European and other languages of scholarship are covered, and new material is added on a continuing basis.

The Indian Antiquary was published under the authority of the Council of the Royal Anthropological Institute from 1925 to 1932.

RAI Collection
The RAI has a unique reference and research collection comprising photos, films, archives and manuscripts.

The photographic library consists of over 75,000 historic prints, negatives, lantern-slides and other images, the earliest dating from the 1860s.  The photo library illustrates the great diversity and vitality of the world's cultures as well as the history of photographic image-making itself.

The RAI is actively involved in developing ethnographic film and video, as a mode of anthropological enquiry and as an educational resource.  It has an extensive collection of videos, copies of which are available for sale for educational and academic purposes.  Films can be studied and previewed onsite.

The archive and manuscript collection spans a period of over 150 years, providing a unique historical record of the discipline and of the Institute itself.  Much unpublished textual and visual material entrusted to the RAI over the years is held in the manuscript collection, which is being conserved and catalogued on a continuing basis.

Access to the RAI Collection is free to all RAI Fellows, Members, Student Associates and all undergraduate students by prior appointment.  Others may visit the Collection on payment of an access fee.

The RAI has a close association with the British Museum's Anthropology Library, which incorporates the former RAI Library given to the Museum in 1976.  The Library is located within the Centre for Anthropology at the British Museum, and is effectively Britain's national anthropological library.  All may use the Library on site; RAI Fellows may borrow books acquired by the RAI.

Awards

Huxley Memorial Medal 

The Huxley Memorial Medal and Lecture was established in 1900 in memory of Thomas Henry Huxley to identify and acknowledge the work of scientists, British or foreign, distinguished in any field of anthropological research. The highest honour awarded by the Royal Anthropological Institute, it is awarded annually by ballot of the council. The recipient delivers a lecture which is usually published.

Rivers Memorial Medal
The Medal was founded in 1923 by the Council of the Institute in memory of its late President, William Halse Rivers, originally for 'anthropological work in the field'. However, in the 1960s the rules were amended to reflect anthropological work in a broader sense. The Medal shall be awarded for a recent body of work published over a period of five years which makes, as a whole, a significant contribution to social, physical or cultural anthropology or archaeology. Recipients include:

RAI events
From time to time, the RAI runs lectures, workshops and other special events on topical issues.  Its International Festivals of Ethnographic Film, run every two years in partnership with UK universities and other hosts, are a recognised part of the international ethnographic film calendar.  Competitions for the Film Prizes attract entries from film-makers throughout the world.

FRAI (Fellowship of the Royal Anthropological Institute)
This is a prestigious fellowship  in the discipline of Anthropology worldwide. Fellows are elected by the Council of the RAI through a rigorous process.

Presidents 
The President of the RAI were generally elected for a two-year period:

See also
 List of anthropology awards

Notes

External links
The Royal Anthropological Institute
Discover Anthropology Outreach Programme
London Anthropology Day 
RAI International Festival of Ethnographic Film

1871 establishments in the United Kingdom
Anthropology organizations
Learned societies of the United Kingdom
Organisations based in the London Borough of Camden
Organizations established in 1871